Mighty Man is one of a group of fictional superhero characters that make up the super team the Protectors, from Malibu Comics. Mighty Man is a pastiche of Giant-Man (of Marvel Comics) and The Atom (of DC Comics).

Fictional character biography

While exploring an isolated region of northern Canada, Professor Richard Pearson happened upon a hidden valley of a lost city. The valley was inhabited by a race of giants, with only one of them surviving, a giant child. Prof. Pearson decided to 'adopt' the giant youth, who stood 12 feet tall, and brought him to the United States. Dr. Francis Hilldale, a confidant of Prof. Pearson, attempted an experiment that would shrink the giant child to normal size. After which, Scott Pearson found that he could alter his size at will, whether growing to a height of 20 feet or shrinking to the size of a doll. Being the last surviving member of his lost race, Mighty Man is in a lot of ways a true 'alien'. Though not from America, he takes pride in being part of a team determined to protect it, at all costs.

Powers and abilities
Mighty Man's main powers involve size manipulation. In the Protectors comic, he is able to grow greater than 20 ft and his strength increased with increased size. Mighty Man also has the ability to shrink at will, retaining his normal strength level while being the size of a doll.

References

Protectors characters
Golden Age superheroes